The Stadio comunale Luigi Ferraris, also known as the Marassi from the name of the neighbourhood where it is located, is a multi-use stadium in Genoa, Italy. The home of Genoa C.F.C. and U.C. Sampdoria football clubs, it opened in 1911 and is the oldest stadium still in use for football and other sports in Italy. Aside from football, the stadium has hosted meetings of rugby in the Italy national team and, more rarely, some concerts.

The stadium is named after Luigi Ferraris (1887–1915), an Italian footballer, engineer and soldier who died during WWI.

Notable matches
The stadium was inaugurated on 22 January 1911 with a football match between Genoa and Internazionale, and had a capacity of 20,000. On 22 December 1912, it hosted its first international, in which Italy lost 3–1 to Austria in a friendly.

It also hosted the 1934 World Cup round-of-16 match between Spain and Brazil, and by then its capacity had been expanded to 30,000.

The stadium was dismantled and rebuilt before the 1990 FIFA World Cup, for which it hosted three Group C matches (between Costa Rica, Scotland and Sweden) and a round-of-16 match between the Republic of Ireland and Romania.

The highest attendance at the Luigi Ferraris was 60,000 on 27 February 1949, for a match between Italy and Portugal.

On 12 October 2010, a Euro 2012 qualifier between Italy and Serbia was abandoned after Serbia fans continued to throw flares onto the pitch and light fireworks. When the game finally began, more flares and fireworks were thrown onto the field and the referee stopped the match after only six minutes of play.

On 29 February 2012, the United States defeated Italy 1–0 in a friendly played at the stadium. It was the first time in almost 100 years that Italy had been defeated in Genoa after 22 December 1912 defeat against Austria, and the first time that the US had ever defeated Italy.

On 14 November 2014, it hosted Italy's end-of-year rugby union international against Argentina who won 20–18.

Average attendances

1990 FIFA World Cup
The stadium was one of the venues of the 1990 FIFA World Cup, and held the following matches:

References

External links

Stadio Luigi Ferraris on Russian Sampdoria website
Article at stadiumguide.com

Luigi Ferraris
Luigi Ferraris
Luigi Ferraris
Sports venues completed in 1911
1934 FIFA World Cup stadiums
1990 FIFA World Cup stadiums
Buildings and structures in Genoa
Sports venues in Liguria
Sport in Genoa
1911 establishments in Italy